John Ellenwood (September 15, 1777 – May 9, 1856) was an American politician who served one term in the Michigan House of Representatives immediately after its establishment by the state's first constitution.

Biography 

John Ellenwood was born in Amherst, New Hampshire, on September 15, 1777, the son of Ebenezer Ellenwood and Elizabeth Seaton. He worked as a surveyor, served as town clerk in Amherst from 1812 to 1814, then moved to Ridgeway, New York, in 1816.

He moved to West Bloomfield, Michigan, in 1823, and again worked as a surveyor, helping to lay out most of the roads that were laid out in the county at the time. He was appointed a justice of the peace in 1827 and held that position his entire life. He was a delegate to the state's first constitutional convention in 1835, and was elected as a Democrat to the Michigan House of Representatives following the constitution's adoption. He also served as postmaster from 1831 to 1856, and as a supervisor for nine years.

He died at home on the family farm on May 9, 1856.

Family 

Ellenwood married Jane Stanley on June 23, 1799. They had five children: Calvin, Eben, Jane Seaton, Ismenia Stanley, and John Morris. Jane Ellenwood died on April 1, 1864.

Notes

References 
 
 
 
 
 

1777 births
1856 deaths
Democratic Party members of the Michigan House of Representatives
Delegates to the 1835 Michigan Constitutional Convention